In American football, the specific role that a player takes on the field is referred to as their "position". Under the modern rules of American football, both teams are allowed 11 players on the field at one time and have "unlimited free substitutions", meaning that they may change any number of players during any "dead ball" situation. This has resulted in the development of three task-specific "platoons" of players within any single team: the offense (the team with possession of the ball, which is trying to score), the defense (the team trying to prevent the other team from scoring, and to take the ball from them), and the so-called 'special teams' (who play in all kicking situations). Within these three separate "platoons", various positions exist depending on the jobs that the players are doing.

Offense 
In American football, the offense is the team that has possession of the ball and is advancing toward the opponent's end zone to score points. The eleven players of the offense can be separated into two main groups: the five offensive linemen, whose primary job is to block opponents and protect their quarterback, and the other six backs and receivers, whose primary job is to move the ball down the field by either running with it or passing it.

The organization of the offense is strictly mandated by the rules of the sport: there must be at least seven players on the line of scrimmage and no more than four players (known collectively as "backs") behind it. The only players eligible to handle the ball during a normal play are the backs and the two players on the end of the line (the "ends"). These players make up the "skill positions" and are also referred to as "eligible receivers" or "eligible ball carriers". The remaining players (known as "interior linemen") are "ineligible" to catch forward passes. Within these strictures, however, creative coaches have developed a wide array of offensive formations to take advantage of different player skills and game situations.

The following positions are standard in nearly every game, though different teams will use different arrangements of them, dependent on their individual game plans.

Offensive (interior) line 

The offensive line is primarily responsible for blocking the defensive line of the opposition, in order to protect their own quarterback. During normal play, offensive linemen do not handle the ball (aside from the snap from center), unless the ball is fumbled by a ball carrier, a pass is deflected, or a player who is normally an offensive lineman takes a different position on the field. The offensive line consists of:

Center (C) 
The center is the player who begins the play from scrimmage by snapping the ball to the quarterback. As the name suggests, the center usually plays in the middle of the offensive line, though some teams may employ an unbalanced line where the center is offset to one side. Like all offensive linemen, the center has the responsibility to block defensive players. The center often also has the responsibility to call out blocking assignments and make last second adjustments depending on the defensive alignment.

Offensive guard (OG) 
Two guards line up directly on either side of the center. Like all interior linemen, their function is to block on both running and passing plays. On some plays, rather than blocking straight ahead, a guard will "pull", whereby the guard comes out of their position in line to lead block for a ball carrier, on plays known as "traps" (for inside runs),  "sweeps" (for outside runs), and "screens" (for passing plays).  In such cases, the guard is referred to as a "pulling guard".

Offensive tackle (OT) 
Two tackles play outside of the guards. Their role is primarily to block on both running and passing plays. The area from one tackle to the other is an area of "close line play" in which blocks from behind, which are prohibited elsewhere on the field, are allowed. For a right-handed quarterback, the left tackle is charged with protecting the quarterback from being hit from behind (known as the "blind side"), and this is usually the most skilled player on the offensive line. Like a guard, the tackle may have to "pull", on a running play, when there is a tight end on their side. Tackles typically have a taller, longer build than interior offensive linemen, due to the need to keep separation from defensive linemen in pass blocking situations. They also tend to have quick footwork skills as they often engage against containing or rushing defensive ends.

Backs and receivers (R)
Four backs line up behind the line of scrimmage. Additionally, there are two receivers, one on each end of the line of scrimmage, who line up outside of the interior linemen. There are four main positions in this set of players:

Quarterback (QB) 
The quarterback is the player who receives the ball from the center to start the play. Considered the most influential position on the offensive side because his team's progress down the field is dependent on his success, the quarterback is responsible for receiving the play from the coaches on the sideline and communicating the play to the other offensive players in the huddle, and serves as the leader of the team's passing game. The quarterback may need to make late changes to the intended play at the line of scrimmage (known as an "audible") depending on the defensive alignment. At the start of the play, the quarterback may be lined up in one of three positions. If he is positioned directly behind and in contact with the center and receives the ball via the direct hand-to-hand pass, he is said to be "under center". Alternatively, if he is lined up some distance behind the center, he is said to be either in "shotgun formation" or in "pistol formation" ('shotgun' is generally further back than 'pistol'). Upon receiving the ball from the center, the quarterback has three basic options to advance the ball: he may run the ball himself (most commonly referred to as scrambling), he may hand it to another eligible ball carrier to run with it, or he may execute a forward pass to a player further up the field.

Running back (HB/FB) 
Running backs are players who line up behind the offensive line in a position to receive a hand-off from the quarterback and execute a rushing play. Anywhere from one to three running backs may be utilized on a play (or none, which is referred to as an "empty backfield"). Depending on where they line up and what role they have, running backs come in several varieties. The "tailback", also known as the "halfback", is often a team's primary ball carrier on rushing plays. They may also catch passes, often acting as a "check-down" or "safety valve" when all other receivers on a pass play are covered. The "fullback" is often larger and stronger than the tailback and acts primarily as a blocker, though the fullback may also be used for catching passes or for rushing as a tailback does. Fullbacks often line up closer to the line of scrimmage than tailbacks do in order to block for them on rushing plays. A "wing-back" or a "slot-back" is a term for a running back who lines up behind the line of scrimmage outside the tackle or tight end on either side of the offensive line. Slot-backs are usually only found in certain offensive alignments, such as the flexbone formation. There also exists a similar position, known as the "H-back", that is actually considered a modification of the normal tight end position.

Wide receiver (WR) 

Wide receivers are pass-catching specialists. Typically fast and tall, their main job is to run pass routes and get open (i.e. find a position with no near defender) for passes, although they are occasionally called on to block. Wide receivers generally line up split "wide" near the sidelines at the start of the play. Wide receivers, like running backs, come in different varieties depending on exactly where they line up. A wide receiver who is directly on the line of scrimmage is called a "split end" and is counted among the seven required players on the line of scrimmage. A wide receiver who lines up behind the line (and thus counts as one of the four backs) is called the "flanker". A wide receiver who lines up between the outermost wide receiver and the offensive line is said to be "in the slot" and is called the "slot receiver". A wide receiver who can play running back is called a wide back.

Tight end (TE) 
Tight ends play on either side of the offensive line and directly next to the tackles. Tight ends are considered "hybrid players" because they are a cross between a wide receiver and an offensive lineman. Because they play next to the other offensive linemen, they are very frequently called on to block, especially on running plays. However, because they are eligible receivers, they may also catch passes. The position known as the "H-back" is a tight end who lines up behind the line of scrimmage, and is thus counted as one of the four "backs", but their role is otherwise similar to that of other tight ends.

Depending on the style of offense the coaches have designed, the game situation, and the relative skill sets of the players, teams may run formations that contain any number of running backs, wide receivers, and tight ends, so long as the mandated "four backs and seven on the line" rule is followed. For many years, the standard set consisted of the quarterback, two running backs (a tailback/halfback and a fullback), two wide receivers (a flanker and a split end) and a tight end. Modern teams show a wide variety of formations, from a "full house" formation with three running backs, two tight ends, and no wide receivers, to "spread" formations featuring four or five wide receivers and either one or no running backs.

Defense 
The defensive team, simply known as the "defense", is the team that begins a play from scrimmage without possession of the ball. The objective of the defensive team is to prevent the other team from scoring and win possession of the ball for their side. The defense accomplishes this by forcing the offense to turn the ball over by either preventing them from achieving a first down and forcing them to punt, forcing and recovering an offensive fumble, intercepting a pass, or, more rarely, forcing a turnover on downs.

Unlike the offensive team, the rules of the sport do not restrict the defensive team into certain positions. A defensive player may line up anywhere on his side of the line of scrimmage and perform any legal action. Over time, however, defensive roles have become defined into three main sets of players that encompass several individual positions.

Defensive line 

Like their offensive counterparts, defensive linemen (also called rushers) line up directly on the line of scrimmage. There are two positions usually considered part of the defensive line:

Defensive tackle (DT); 
Sometimes called a "defensive guard", defensive tackles play at the center of the defensive line. Their function is to rush the passer and stop running plays directed at the middle of the line of scrimmage. The most interior defensive tackle who sometimes lines up directly across from the ball and is, therefore, almost nose-to-nose with the offense's center is often called a "nose tackle" (alternately "nose guard" or "middle guard"). The nose tackle is most common in the 3–4 defense. Most defensive sets have one or two defensive tackles. If one employs a second defensive tackle, sometimes referred to as an "under tackle", they are usually a bit faster than the nose tackle.

Defensive end (DE) 
Defensive ends line up outside of the defensive tackles and are the "ends" of the defensive line. Their function is to attack the passer or stop offensive runs to the outer edges of the line of scrimmage, which is often referred to as "containment". The faster of the two is usually placed on the right side of the defensive line (quarterback's left) because that is a right-handed quarterback's blind side.

Defensive linemen will often take a stance with one or both of their hands on the ground before the ball is snapped. These are known as a "three-point stance" and "four-point stance" respectively, and this helps distinguish a defensive lineman from a linebacker, who begins in a two-point stance (i.e. without a hand touching the ground).

Linebackers 

Linebackers play behind the defensive line and perform various duties depending on the situation, including rushing the passer, covering receivers, and defending against the run.

Middle linebacker (MLB) 
Sometimes called the "inside linebacker" (especially in a 3–4 defense), and known colloquially as the "Mike" linebacker, the middle linebacker is often known as the "quarterback of the defense", as they are frequently the primary defensive play callers and must react to a wide variety of situations. Middle linebackers must be capable of stopping running backs who make it past the defensive line, covering pass plays over the middle, and rushing the quarterback on blitz plays.

Outside linebacker (OLB) 
Outside linebackers are given different names depending on their role and the philosophy of the team. Some teams keep their outside linebackers on the same side of the field at all times while others define them as playing on either the "strongside" (SLB) or the "weakside" (WLB). The strongside, or "Sam", linebacker lines up on the same side as the offensive tight end and often is responsible for covering the tight end or running back on pass plays. The weakside, or "Will", linebacker lines up on the side of the offensive line without a tight end and is often used to rush, or blitz, the quarterback or to cover a running back on pass plays. Some are occasionally referred to as edge rushers.

Defensive backs 
Defensive backs, also known as the "secondary", play either behind the linebackers or outside near the sidelines and are primarily used to defend against pass plays. They also act as the last line of defense on running plays and need to be able to make open field tackles, especially when the ball carrier has gotten past the other defenders. A normal defensive lineup includes two cornerbacks and two safeties, though specialty defensive backs (nickelbacks and dime backs) can be brought in in place of linebackers and defensive linemen when there is a need to cover additional receivers.

Cornerback (CB) 
Cornerbacks attempt to prevent successful passes by either swatting the airborne ball away from the receiver or by catching the pass themselves. In rushing situations, their job is to contain the runner, either by directing them back to the middle of the field to be tackled by the middle line backers, or by forcing them out of bounds.

Safety (S) 
The safeties are the last line of defense (furthest from the line of scrimmage) and usually help the corners with deep-pass coverage. The strong safety (SS) is usually the larger and stronger of the two, providing extra protection against run plays by standing closer to the line of scrimmage, usually on the strong (tight end) side of the field. The free safety (FS) is usually the smaller and faster of the two, and is usually the deepest player on the defense, providing help on long pass plays.

Nickelback and dimeback 
In certain formations, the defense may remove a linebacker or a defensive lineman to bring in extra pass coverage in the form of extra defensive backs. A formation with five defensive backs is often called a "nickel" formation, and the fifth (extra) defensive back is called a "nickelback" after the U.S. nickel coin, a five-cent piece. By extension, a formation with a sixth defensive back (dimeback) is called a "dime package" because it employs a second nickelback and the U.S. 10-cent dime coin is equal to two nickels (nickelbacks). Although it is a rare occurrence, a team may also use seven or eight defensive backs on a play, as well.

Defensive formations are often known by a numerical code indicating the number of players at each position. The two most common formations are the 3–4 defense and the 4–3 defense, where the first number refers to the number of defensive linemen, and the second number refers to the number of linebackers (the number of defensive backs can be inferred, since there must be eleven players on the field). Thus, a 3–4 defense consists of three defensive linemen (usually a nose tackle and two defensive ends), four linebackers, and four defensive backs (two cornerbacks, a strong safety, and a free safety).

Special teams

Special teams are units that are on the field during kicking plays. While many players who appear on offensive or defensive squads also play similar roles on special teams (offensive linemen to block or defensive players to tackle), there are some specialist roles that are unique to the kicking game.

Kicking specialists 
Kicking specialists are in charge of kicking the football. Depending on the type of specialist and the play that was called, the responsibilities of these positions vary.

Kicker (K) 
Also called a "placekicker", kickers handle kickoffs, extra points, and field goals. All three situations require the kicker to kick the ball off the ground, either from the hands of a holder or off of a tee. Some teams employ two kickers: one kicks extra points and field goals, and the other, known as a "kickoff specialist", handles kickoffs. Most, however, use a single kicker for both jobs, and rarely, the same player may also punt.

Kickoff specialist (KOS) 
Kickoff specialists are the kickers of kickoffs. In most cases, the kickoff specialist is also the placekicker. Teams may employ pure kickoff specialists if they feel neither their kicker nor punter is good enough at kickoffs. Due to their specialized nature and the limited number of active roster spots, professional full-time KOSs are rare.

Punter (P) 
 The punter usually lines up 15 yards behind the line of scrimmage. However, this distance has to be shortened when it would result in being on or behind the end line. After receiving the snap, the punter drops the football and kicks, or "punts," it from the air in order to relinquish possession to the defensive team and to send the ball as far downfield as possible. This is usually done only on fourth down.

Other special teams positions 
Almost all other special teams positions double as backups for skill positions.

Holder (H) 
 The holder is usually positioned 7–8 yards from the line of scrimmage and holds the ball for the placekicker to kick. The player occupying this position is often a backup quarterback or a punter because of their "good hands," feel for the ball, and experience taking snaps from a long snapper or center during plays from scrimmage. A holder is occasionally used on kickoffs if the weather or field conditions repeatedly cause the ball to fall off the tee.

Long snapper (LS) 
 The long snapper is a specialized center who snaps the ball directly to the holder or punter. They are usually distinct from a regular center, as the ball often has to be snapped much farther back on kicking plays than on standard offensive plays. Long snappers are generally the size of tight ends or linebackers, as they not only have to be big enough to block for the punter or kicker, but also athletic enough to run down the field on coverage to try and tackle the return man. In the past, long snappers were often backup players, but nowadays this position is usually played by dedicated long snappers.

Kick returner (KR) and punt returner (PR) 
Returners are responsible for catching kicked balls (either on kickoffs or punts) and running the ball back. These are usually among the fastest players on a team and typically play either wide receiver or cornerback, as well. However, due to the relatively high likelihood of injury during kick returns, most professional teams will not regularly use their very best WRs or CBs as returners. Teams may also use the same player for both return positions or have a specific returner for punts and another for kickoffs.

Upback 
 The upback is a blocking back who lines up approximately 1–3 yards behind the line of scrimmage in punting situations. Because the punter plays so far back, the back frequently makes the line calls and lets the long snapper know when the punter is ready to receive the ball. Their primary role is to act as the last line of defense for the punter; however, upbacks occasionally receive the snap instead on fake punts and will either pass or run with the football in those situations. Upbacks are usually played by backup running backs or linebackers.

Gunner 
 A gunner is a player on kickoffs and punts who specializes in running down the field very quickly in an attempt to tackle the returner. They usually line up near the sidelines where there will be fewer blockers which allows them to get down the field quickly. Wide receivers and cornerbacks often fill the role as gunner.

Jammer 
Jammers try to slow down gunners during punts or kickoffs so the returners have more time to move down the field.

See also
American football strategy
Glossary of American football
Rugby league positions
Rugby union positions
History of American football positions

Notes

References